The Rebellion R-One is a sports prototype racing car built by French constructor Oreca on behalf of Swiss-based team Rebellion Racing. It is designed to meet the 2014 LMP1-L regulations for Le Mans Prototypes in the FIA World Endurance Championship as well as at the 24 Hours of Le Mans, and replaces the Lola B12/60 chassis. The first two R-Ones debuted at the 2014 6 Hours of Spa-Francorchamps, round two of the FIA World Endurance Championship. The Rebellion R-One shares the same monocoque as the Oreca 05, and the Oreca 07.

Development
Since forming in 2008 as a partnership between Speedy Racing Team and Sebah Automotive, Rebellion Racing have been using chassis from Lola Cars in the LMP2 class before switching to LMP1 in 2009. In 2011, Rebellion announced a partnership with Toyota Motorsport GmbH confirming an engine supply partnership.

Since Lola became defunct at the end of 2012, parts for Rebellion's existing B12/80's became increasingly difficult to obtain. Rebellion managed to negotiate a deal with French constructor Oreca towards the end of 2013 for a LMP1-spec car for the 2014 season. The car was designed "in record time" according to Oreca Technical Director David Floury. The car only began testing in April 2014 and was not ready for the first race of the FIA WEC season, the 6 Hours of Silverstone, therefore Rebellion had to race with the two existing Lola B12/80s for the Silverstone race before switching to the R-Ones for round 2 at Spa-Francorchamps.

Racing history

2014 season
The 2014 6 Hours of Spa-Francorchamps was the public début of the Rebellion R-One. Both cars were struggling with teething issues that usually accompany brand new cars. The two cars were the only entrants in the privateer LMP1-L class so they were guaranteed to win the class, regardless if it was the No. 12 or 13 car. It was car number 12 that looked most likely after qualifying, where it started 12th on the grid while car 13 failed to set a time and started at the back of the grid. Car number 12 driven by Nicolas Prost, Nick Heidfeld and Mathias Beche climbed five positions and finished seventh overall, ten laps down on the overall winning Toyota hybrid. The No. 13 car was the only retirement of the race, bowing out due to electrical problems after completing 47 laps.

Note* Rebellion Racing used Lola B12/60's during the 2014 6 Hours of Silverstone

2015 season
The car underwent an engine change for the 2015 season, changing to an Advanced Engine Research 2.4L twin-turbo V6. This necessitated extensive revisions to the chassis and as a result the team missed the first two races of the season in order to modify and test the cars. Due to the new AER P60 engine, the car featured a new cooling layout with dual heat exchangers on both sides of the car, a revised transmission, and most noticeably, a distinctive split airbox, located further back on the engine cover compared to that used on the Rebellion-Toyota. The split necessary, due to the airbox being located so far back on the car, that the mandatory fin had to pass through its centre The revised car was tested for the first time at Paul Ricard in France at the end of May and was expected to take part in the Le Mans 24 Hours.

2016 season
The Rebellion teams cars retained using Advanced Engine Research 2.4L twin-turbo V6 engines while also switching from Michelin to Dunlop Tyres. Their drivers would be Nick Heidfeld, Nicolas Prost and Nelson Piquet Jr. with Mathias Beche appearing only in round 4 in the #12 entry car. Dominik Kraihamer, Alexandre Imperatori and Mathéo Tuscher would be the driver line-up in the #13 car. From the 2016 6 Hours of Mexico round  and onwards for the rest of the season the team would only run one car (The #13 Entry).

See also 

 CLM P1/01
 Oreca 05

References

External links
 Rebellion Racing official website
 Rebellion R-One Specifications 

Le Mans Prototypes
24 Hours of Le Mans race cars
Sports prototypes